The John Jacob Rogers Award is an obsolete award of the United States Department of State.  It has since been replaced with the Secretary’s Career Achievement Award.  It was presented to retiring career employees in the Department who, over a period of 25 years or more, of U.S. government or military service, performed with dedication and distinction.

The award consisted of a silver medal set and a certificate signed by the secretary. It was named for Congressman John Jacob Rogers, for whom the Rogers Act of 1924 is named. The Rogers Act consolidated the diplomatic and consular officers into one diplomatic corps, which is now the US Foreign Service.

The original medal was sterling silver with the text "John Jacob Rogers Award" inscribed across the top, "U.S. Department of State" across the bottom, and the Great Seal of the United States superimposed over a globe surrounded by laurel wreath.

Nomination and approval procedures

There is no nomination procedure.  The John Jacob Rogers Award was automatically awarded to all Department of State employees with 25 or more years of service performed with “dedication and distinction.”

Military use

This award is not issued to active-duty military.

References

External links
Department of State Honor Awards
Orders and Medals Society of America Medal Database

See also 
Awards of the United States Department of State
Awards and decorations of the United States government
United States Department of State
U.S. Foreign Service

United States Department of State
Long service medals
Awards and decorations of the United States Department of State